Group J of the 2019 FIBA Basketball World Cup was the second stage of the 2019 FIBA Basketball World Cup for four teams, top two teams from Group C and two from Group D. The results of round one were carried over. The teams played against the teams from the group they have not faced before, for a total of two games per team, with all games played at Wuhan Gymnasium, Wuhan. After all of the games were played, the top two teams advanced to Quarter-finals, the third placed team was classified 9 to 12 and the fourth placed team 13 to 16.

Qualified teams

Standings

Games
All times are local UTC+8.

Serbia vs. Puerto Rico
This was the first game between Puerto Rico and Serbia in the World Cup. Serbia won in its last competitive game against Puerto Rico, in the 2016 FIBA World Olympic Qualifying Tournament.

Spain vs. Italy

Puerto Rico vs. Italy

Spain vs. Serbia
This was the third match between Spain and Serbia in the World Cup, with both teams winning once in previous matches. Serbia won in its last competitive game against Spain, in EuroBasket 2015 group stage.

See also
 2019 Italy FIBA Basketball World Cup team
 2019 Serbia FIBA Basketball World Cup team

References

External links

2019 FIBA Basketball World Cup
Serbia at the 2019 FIBA Basketball World Cup
Italy at the 2019 FIBA Basketball World Cup